Dunbar is a census-designated place in the town of Dunbar, Marinette County, Wisconsin, United States. Dunbar has a post office with ZIP code 54119. As of the 2010 census, its population is 50.

Images

See also
 List of census-designated places in Wisconsin

References

External links

Census-designated places in Marinette County, Wisconsin
Census-designated places in Wisconsin